Down Fall The Good Guys is the second full-length album by the band Wolfsbane. Two singles were released from the album, "Ezy", which got to number 68, and "After Midnight", which did not chart. The album was produced by Brendan O'Brien, later famous for his work for The Black Crowes, The Offspring, Pearl Jam, Rage Against the Machine, Stone Temple Pilots and Neil Young. The album was engineered by Gareth Cousins.

The album cover artwork was by Simon Piasecki Maxted.

Track list
 "Smashed and Blind" - 4:41
 "You Load Me Down" - 3:02
 "Ezy" - 3:38
 "Black Lagoon" - 4:43
 "Broken Doll" - 4:41
 "Twice as Mean" - 4:38
 "Cathode Ray Clinic" - 5:02
 "The Loveless" - 3:58
 "After Midnight" - 4:05
 "Temple of Rock" - 2:48
 "Moonlight" - 2:18
 "Dead at Last" - 2:40

Personnel
Blaze Bayley: Vocals
Jason Edwards: Guitar
Jeff Hately: Bass
Steve Ellet: Drums

References

Wolfsbane (band) albums
1991 albums
Albums produced by Brendan O'Brien (record producer)
American Recordings (record label) albums